Owings Mills High School (OMHS) is a four-year public high school in Owings Mills, Maryland, United States. It is part of the Baltimore County Public Schools consolidated school district.

History
Construction for Owings Mills Junior-Senior High School began in 1978. Students were housed temporarily at Pikesville Junior High and Sudbrook Middle School during the construction.  Owings Mills opened in February, 1979 as a junior-senior high for grades 7-12.  However, during the first year, there was no twelfth grade class. The class of 1980 was the first class to graduate from Owings Mills and the class of 1991 was the last class that attended Owings Mills High from grades 7-12.  It became a traditional high school after that year.

Academics
Owings Mills High school received a 42.2 out of a possible 100 points (42%) on the 2018-2019 Maryland State Department of Education Report Card and received a 2 out of 5 star rating, ranking in the 17th percentile among all Maryland schools.

Students
The 2019–2020 enrollment at Owings Mills High School was 1189 students.

Athletics

State championships!!
Girls Basketball: 
Class C 1984
Wrestling:
Group:
Class 2A-1A 1991, 1992, 1995, 1996, 2003, 2004, and 2005
Class 2A-1A Dual Meet 2002, 2003, 2004, and 2008

Notable alumni
Majid Khan, Pakistani detainee held at the Guantanamo Bay detention camp
Donovan Smith, NFL player, Super Bowl LV winner
Kevin Kadish, Songwriter
Jasper Pääkkönen, Finnish film actor and entrepreneur

See also
List of high schools in Maryland

References and notes

External links
 Owings Mills High School website

Public high schools in Maryland
Baltimore County Public Schools
Middle States Commission on Secondary Schools
Baltimore County, Maryland landmarks
Owings Mills, Maryland